The DeWitt Wallace Institute of Psychiatry: History, Policy, and the Arts at Weill Cornell Medical College in New York, was formerly known as The History of Psychiatry Section.  Founded in 1958 by Dr. Eric T. Carlson, the Institute is devoted to the study of the history of the mind-sciences and the preservation of resources on the history of psychology, psychiatry, psychoanalysis, neuroscience and other related disciplines.  Its companion library, the Oskar Diethelm Library, houses over 50,000 titles on these subjects, with the earliest dating to the 14th century. The present Director is George Makari.

External links 
 The Institute for the History of Psychiatry
 Oskar Diethelm Library
 Weill Cornell Medical College

Colleges and schools of Cornell University
1958 establishments in New York City
History of psychiatry